The McCormack Church is a historic church near Stanford, Kentucky.  It was built in 1820 and added to the National Register in 1976.

It is a brick building on a stone foundation, with brick laid in Flemish bond.

References

External links
History of the church

Churches on the National Register of Historic Places in Kentucky
Federal architecture in Kentucky
Churches completed in 1820
19th-century churches in the United States
National Register of Historic Places in Lincoln County, Kentucky
1820 establishments in Kentucky